Prionochilus is one of two genera flowerpecker that make up the family Dicaeidae. The genus differs from the other flowerpecker genus, Dicaeum in having ten long primary feathers in the wing and in the character of its calls. A study comparing the calls of the two genera suggested that Prionochilus is basal to Dicaeum. The genus contains six species, in contrast to the 44 species in the genus Dicaeum. They have a more restricted distribution than Dicaeum, occurring in the Philippines, Borneo, Sumatra, Java and the Malay Peninsula. The name Prionochilus is derived from the Greek prion for saw, and kheilos for lip, referring to the minute serrations along the edge of the bill.

In common with the other flowerpeckers, the Prionochilus flowerpeckers are small birds, between 9–10 cm in length and weighing 7-23 g. The bill of all the six species is deep, broad and short. In terms of plumage the genus is fairly variable. Four of the six species exhibit sexual dimorphism with regards to plumage, with the males in these cases being more brightly coloured. In four of the six species at least one of the sexes have a white malar stripe on the throat, and all but one of the species has an orange or red patch on the crown.

Like all members of the family the fruits, nectar and pollen of mistletoe (Loranthaceae) are important to the Prionochilus flowerpeckers. In addition, other fruits are taken. Smaller fruits are consumed whole, or squeezed until skin is removed and discarded, then swallowed, whereas larger fruits are pierced with the bill and chunks removed and swallowed. In addition to plant material insects and spiders are eaten as well. Information about the diet (and many other aspects of the biology of this genus and indeed family) is patchy and more research is needed.

Species
 Yellow-breasted flowerpecker (Prionochilus maculatus)
 Olive-backed flowerpecker (Prionochilus olivaceus)
 Crimson-breasted flowerpecker (Prionochilus percussus)
 Palawan flowerpecker (Prionochilus plateni)
 Scarlet-breasted flowerpecker (Prionochilus thoracicus)
 Yellow-rumped flowerpecker (Prionochilus xanthopygius)

References

 
Dicaeidae
Bird genera
 
Taxa named by Hugh Edwin Strickland
Taxonomy articles created by Polbot